Ibbenbüren-Laggenbeck is a railway station located in Laggenbeck, a village of Ibbenbüren, Germany. The station was opened in 1884 and is located on the Löhne–Rheine line. The train services are operated by WestfalenBahn. The station was known as Laggenbeck until December 2004.

Train services
The following services currently call at Rheine:

Regional services  Rheine - Osnabrück - Minden - Hanover - Braunschweig
Local services  Bad Bentheim - Rheine - Osnabrück - Herford - Bielefeld

References

Railway stations in North Rhine-Westphalia
Railway stations in Germany opened in 1884
Ibbenbüren